Collegium Civitas is a private university for the social sciences located in Warsaw, the capital of Poland. It is open to new inventions in higher education: interdisciplinary approaches, closer lecturer-student relations, study abroad programs, internships, and the encouragement and supervision of individual student research projects.

History
It was established under the auspices of five Institutes of the Polish Academy of Sciences (Political Studies, Philosophy and Sociology, History, History of Art, and Slavic Studies) in 1997, and has relied extensively upon the teaching and research traditions of these institutions. Collegium Civitas was the first non-public university in Poland to welcome foreign students, which it did in 1997. 

As of 2021, the Rector was Stanisław Mocek, the President was Jadwiga Koralewicz, and the Chancellor was Magdalena Wypych.

Degrees

The university is formally entitled to grant MA and BA degrees in International Relations, Political Science, and Sociology. Recently, it has also received the right to grant PhD degrees in Sociology.

Location
The university is situated at the centre of Warsaw, in the landmark Palace of Culture and Science, between the ninth and twelfth floors.

Notable alumni

 Adrian Kubicki (born 1987), Consul General of the Republic of Poland in New York City
 Paulina Matysiak (born 1984), member of the 9th term Sejm.
 Robert Rowiński (born 1984), dancer, choreographer, and model.
 Jakub Wesołowski (born 1985), film, television, and theatre actor; journalist.

Notable faculty

 Bronisław Komorowski
 Henryk Lipszyc
 Rafał Pankowski
 Wojciech Roszkowski
 Jacek Saryusz-Wolski
Rafał Trzaskowski
 Edmund Wnuk-Lipiński
Jacek Żakowski
 Krzysztof Zanussi

Programs in English 
 3-year BA in International Relations
 3-year BA in Political Science
 2-year MA in International Relations
 2-year MA in Political Science
 3-year BA in American Studies
 PhD in Sociology

Programs in Polish 
 3-year BA in International Relations
 3-year BA in Political Science
 3-year BA in Sociology
 2-year MA in International Relations
 2-year MA in Political Science
 2-year MA in Sociology
 PhD in Sociology
 4-year PhD in International Relations(offered jointly by Collegium Civitas  and  the Institute of Political Studies at the Polish Academy of Sciences)
 4-year PhD in Slavonic languages and literature(offered jointly by  Collegium Civitas and  the Institute of Slavonic Languages at the Polish Academy of  Sciences)

References

External links
 Collegium Civitas' Homepage
 Programs in English
 Admissions

Collegium Civitas